This team is not to be confused with the softball team in Texas.

The Texas Terminators was an indoor football team that played in the Indoor Professional Football League (IPFL) in 1999. The Terminators franchise was owned by Jeff Parnell. The team office was based in Austin, and played their games in the Travis County Expo Center, known as "The Barn" for Terminators games. The team colors were: Purple, Teal, Black, Grey & White. On September 1, 1998, Texas announced Duane Duncum as its head coach for the Terminators' inaugural season. Duncum's resume included four years of professional football experience: Hamilton Tiger-Cats (CFL), 1991; Orlando Thunder (WLAF), 1992; San Antonio Force (AFL), 1993; and Dallas Texans (AFL), 1994. Prior to his professional career, Duncum was a standout linebacker at the University of Texas. The team held tryouts at Austin High School on October 17, 1998.

The Terminators won a perfect 8-0 at home, 12-4 overall for the 1999 season. Texas won the regular season IPFL title and a bye through the playoffs, straight to the 1999 IPFL Championship Game as the number one seeded team.

1999 Texas Terminators IPFL Schedule 
Week 1 - bye

Week 2 - Texas Terminators 47, at Louisiana Bayou Beast 28

Week 3 - Texas Terminators 36, at Hawaii Hammerheads 21

Week 4 - Texas Terminators 49, at Hawaii Hammerheads 34

Week 5 - Rocky Mountain Thunder 36, at Texas Terminators 29

Week 6 - Texas Terminators 35, at Mississippi Fire Dogs 33

Week 7 - Texas Terminators 62, at Louisiana Bayou Beast 46

Week 8 - Texas Terminators 34, at Mississippi Fire Dogs 5

Week 9 - Texas Terminators 35, at Louisiana Bayou Beast 13

Week 10 - Texas Terminators 58, at Rocky Mountain Thunder 15

Week 11 - Texas Terminators 42, at Idaho Stallions 19

Week 12 - Mississippi Fire Dogs 32, at Texas Terminators 27

Week 13 - Hawaii Hammerheads 55, at Texas Terminators 44

Week 14 - Texas Terminators 44, at Mississippi Fire Dogs 41

Week 15 - Texas Terminators 23, at Louisiana Bayou Beast 16

Week 16 - bye

Week 17 - Idaho Stallions 35, at Texas Terminators 34

Week 18 - Texas Terminators 55, at Idaho Stallions 37

1999 IPFL Championship Game 
On August 20, 1999, the #2 Hawaii Hammerheads (10-6) defeated the #1 ranked Texas Terminators 28-13 at the Travis County Expo Center in front of 4,527 fans. Behind an opportunistic defensive effort, the Hammerheads held the Texas offense, the league's highest-scoring unit well below its regular-season average of 40.8 points per game. In doing so, Texas finished with just eight first downs and 144 yards of total offense. Aside from recording four turnovers (two fumble recoveries and two interceptions), Hawaii also held the regular-season champion Terminators scoreless for two quarters.

Notable players
The Terminators were stocked with a great deal of local talent and former stars of the University of Texas including:  James Brown, Butch Hadnot, and Lance Gunn (who had signed but opted to work for Frito Lay instead.)  The defense was led by Aaron Hamilton, who had 11.5 sacks on the season.

Terminators to skip the 2000 IPFL season 
As posted on the official Texas Terminators website right after the 1999 IPFL Championship Game loss....

Texas Terminator fans,

It is with great regret that I announce that the Texas Terminators Indoor Professional Football team will not be participating in the up coming IPFL 2000 season. We were looking forward to defending our regular season championship in pursuit of winning it all this year.

Last season the Austin metro area fans and media rallied behind our franchise providing an Inaugural season that was second to none in the IPFL. Our games were well attended by football savvy fans and with their support we posted a perfect 8-0 home record. All of the teams in the IPFL knew they were in for a war when they entered "the Barn" as we referred to our home the "Travis County Exposition Center". 

It is that respect for our fans that have led me to forgo participating in the 2000 season. The Exposition Center is a wonderful facility and we were thankful for them allowing us the opportunity to play there. The facts sadly can not be ignored and the conditions were less than optimal for indoor football in July and August.

The IPFL as a league will continue to grow as evidenced by the addition of Portland, Omaha, and Shreveport this year. The play of the Texas Terminators reaffirmed that Texas is the home of football. 

To the media, our fans and friends rest assured the Texas Terminators will a find suitable venue to continue bringing you the same "Wall-to-Wall" football excitement that you have come to expect from your team. 

WE'LL Be BACK!

Thank you

Jeff Parnell

Texas Terminators owner

However, neither Parnell nor the Terminators were ever heard from again publicly.

References

External links 
 Indoor football team may be headed to Austin

Indoor Professional Football League teams
American football teams in Austin, Texas
Defunct American football teams in Texas
1999 establishments in Texas
1999 disestablishments in Texas
American football teams established in 1999
American football teams disestablished in 1999